Shahanpan Dega Deva is a Marathi movie released on January 21, 2011. The movie was produced by Mirah Entertainment Pvt. Ltd and directed by Sudesh Manjrekar.

Cast 

The cast includes Bharat Jadhav, Ankush Choudhari, Siddharth Jadhav, Santosh Juvekar, Vaibhav Mangale, Kranti Redekar, and Manava Naik  Purva Pawar.

Soundtrack
The music is provided by Ajeet and Sameer.

References

External links

  Movie Review - gomolo.com
 Movie Album - dhingana.com

2011 films
2010s Marathi-language films
Films directed by Sudesh Manjrekar